Gert-René Polli (born 10 August 1960) was head of the Austrian Office for the Protection of the Constitution and Counterterrorism from 2002 to 2008.

References

Living people
1960 births
Theresian Military Academy alumni